Peter G. Sheridan (born April 21, 1950) is a senior United States district judge of the United States District Court for the District of New Jersey.

Education and career

Born in Cambridge, Massachusetts, Sheridan received a Bachelor of Science degree from St. Peter's College (now Saint Peter's University) in 1972 and a Juris Doctor from Seton Hall University School of Law in 1977. He was a law clerk for Judge James J. Petrella of the Superior Court of New Jersey, County of Bergen from 1977 to 1978. He was an Attorney for the Office of New Jersey Solicitor, Port Authority of New York/New Jersey from 1978 to 1981. He was in private practice in New Jersey, from 1981 to 1984 and from 1990 to 2006. He was a vice president and general counsel for the Atlantic City Casino Association from 1984 to 1987. He was a director of authorities unit for the Office of Governor Thomas Kean from 1987 to 1990. He was an executive director for the New Jersey Republican State Committee from 1993 to 1994.

Federal judicial service

Sheridan is a United States District Judge of the United States District Court for the District of New Jersey. Sheridan was nominated by President George W. Bush on February 14, 2006, to a seat vacated by Stephen Orlofsky. He was confirmed by the United States Senate on June 8, 2006, and received his commission on June 12, 2006. He assumed senior status on June 14, 2018.

Notable cases
Oshinsky v. New York Football Giants, 2009 WL 4120237 (D.N.J. 2009), denied defendant’s motion for summary judgment on plaintiff’s breach of contract claims, but granted summary judgment as to all other claims. Plaintiff, a New York Giants season ticketholder, sued the team because it required season ticketholders, who wished to continue to purchase season tickets in the New Meadowlands Stadium, to purchase a personal seat license (PSL), which costs up to $20,000 a seat, on top of the cost of the season tickets themselves."N.Y. Giants, Jets Must Defend Suit Over Stadium Seat Licenses", Bloomberg.com, November 21, 2009, last accessed January 8, 2010.
American Broadcasting Companies, Inc. v. Wells, --- F.Supp.2d ----, 2009 WL 3417589 (D.N.J. 2009), granted preliminary injunction allowing media to conduct exit polling within a hundred feet of polling places, after the New Jersey Supreme Court had upheld a policy by the New Jersey Attorney General prohibiting the practice.

Sources

1950 births
Living people
21st-century American judges
Judges of the United States District Court for the District of New Jersey
People from Cambridge, Massachusetts
Saint Peter's University alumni
Seton Hall University School of Law alumni
United States district court judges appointed by George W. Bush